Barrow may refer to:

Places

England
 Barrow-in-Furness, Cumbria
 Borough of Barrow-in-Furness, local authority encompassing the wider area
 Barrow and Furness (UK Parliament constituency)
 Barrow, Cheshire
 Barrow, Gloucestershire
 Barrow, Lancashire
 Barrow, Rutland
 Barrow, Shropshire
 Barrow, Somerset
 Barrow, Suffolk
 Barrow (Lake District), a fell in the county of Cumbria
 Barrow upon Humber, Lincolnshire
 Barrow upon Soar, Leicestershire
 Barrow upon Trent, Derbyshire

Ireland
 River Barrow, the second-longest river in Ireland
 Barrow, a townland in County Kerry, home of Tralee Golf Club

United States
 Barrow County, Georgia
 Barrow, Illinois, an unincorporated community 
 Utqiaġvik, Alaska (formerly known as Barrow)

The Moon
 Barrow (crater)

People
 Barrow (name), a surname, and persons with the name
 Barrows (name), a surname, and persons with the name
 Musa Barrow, Gambian profession footballer

Other uses
 Barrow A.F.C., an association football club based in Barrow-in-Furness
 Barrow Raiders, a rugby league club based in Barrow-in-Furness
 Barrow's Stores, in Birmingham, England
 Barrow (sculpture), a sculpture in Indianapolis by American artist Jill Viney
 A castrated male domestic pig
 Barrow, a burial mound
 Wheelbarrow, a tool for carrying cargo

See also
 Barra (disambiguation)
 Barrow Hill (disambiguation)
 Justice Barrows (disambiguation)
 Barrowcliffe
 Barrel (disambiguation)